The Newtown High School of the Performing Arts is a government-funded co-educational comprehensive and specialist secondary day school in the suburb of Newtown in Sydney, New South Wales, Australia. It is among a small number of performing arts and visual arts schools in Australia. All students are required to study drama, music, dance and visual arts subjects as part of the curriculum for the first year of secondary school, and one performing or visual arts subject until Year 11. The school participates in a number of events both on and off campus in all types of performing and visual arts as well as video, technical, costume and design.

In 2016 it adopted an 'inclusive' uniform policy, under which there are separate 'boys' and 'girls' uniforms and students may wear whichever they prefer.

The school is run by the New South Wales Department of Education. Sharon Roberts has principal since February 2020.

The school caters for approximately 1,200 students from Year 7 to Year 12.

History 

The school remains open and accessible to the local population, however a larger percentage of prospective students from outside the local acceptance boundaries can audition to obtain a place at the school.

Extracurricular activities are available; there are ensembles and companies in the music, drama and dance departments.

Alumni 

 Christopher Bahng/Bang (2014)professionally known as Bang Chan; leader of South Korean boy group Stray Kids under JYP Entertainment
 Ed Oxenbould (2019) - actor
 Maya Cumming (2019) former Internet personality and pop musician known as MAY-A
 Alycia Debnam-Carey (2011)actress
 Indiana Evans (2003)actress
 Lindsay Farris (2003)actor and Artistic Director of the National Youth Theatre Company and founding Chairman of the National Youth Theatre Company Foundation
 Nathan Foley (1997)cast-member of Hi-5
 Abe Forsythe (1999)actor
 Virginia Gay (1999)actor
 Tamara Jaber (1999)recording artist
 Rose Jackson (2002)former president of the University of Sydney Students' Representative Council and past president of the National Union of Students
 David Jones-Roberts (2008)actor
 Emma Lung (1999)actor
 Hanna Mangan-Lawrence (2008)actress
 Alyssa McClelland (1999)actor
 Ralph Myers (1996)artistic director of theatre company Company B Belvoir
 Jordan 'Friendlyjordies' Shanks (2007) - Youtuber and Political commentator 
 Elana Stone (1998)jazz singer and band leader
 Yael Stone (2003)actress
 Samuel Thomson (2014)actor and rhythmic gymnastics, Australian youth champion at the 2012 Australian games 
 Jessica Tovey (2005)actress
 Odessa Young (2013)actress
 Jac Bowie (1997)entrepreneur, Founder of Business in Heels
 Elle Dawe
 Paddy Cornwall - bass player for Indie Rock group Sticky Fingers
 Milly Alcock (2018)actress

See also 

 List of government schools in New South Wales
 List of selective high schools in New South Wales
 List of creative and performing arts high schools in New South Wales

References

External links 

 

Creative and performing arts high schools in New South Wales
Educational institutions established in 1990
1990 establishments in Australia
Public high schools in Sydney
Newtown, New South Wales